Yarrawonga Airport  is located  south-east of the town of Yarrawonga, Victoria on the border with New South Wales, Australia.

See also
 List of airports in Victoria

References

Airports in Victoria (Australia)